The Zee Horror Show is an Indian horror weekly television series presented by Ramsay Brothers and that aired on Zee TV from 1993 to 2001.

The first episode was titled "Dastak" which was telecast on 9 August 1993 and featured Pankaj Dheer, Shagufta Ali and Archana Puran Singh. Initially it was a 24 episode deal with Subhash Chandra which later ran for 9 years.

Episodes

The Zee Horror Show

Anhonee

Soundtrack
The opening theme was composed by Ajit Singh and Uttam Singh. The tune was earlier the background score for several movies of Ramsay Brothers with the first one being Purana Mandir (1984) which was rearranged.

Broadcast
Zee Cinema regularly telecasted the episodes of 1993-94 in movie format. On 9 August 1997, Taveez was telecast. Rajesh Cable recorded them and Zee Cinema had several reruns of those episodes like Khauf and Taveez under the title Chills & Thrills till 2004.
 
Zee Café aired Season 1 episodes in UK with English subtitles from 2 January 2012 till 22 April 2012.
 
Zee Smile started airing Anhonee from May 2015 until the closedown of the channel.
 
A Pakistani channel Apna Channel started to broadcast Season 1 episodes under the title Apna Horror Show from June 2015. In October 2016 Pakistan government banned Indian shows and this show stopped airing. The show returned in August 2017 and got shut down in November 2018 again for the same reason.

Thriller Active Channel available only on Dish TV and Videocon D2H aired some episodes of Season 1 from 30 September 2018 to 20 October 2019.

The series aired on The Horror TV available only on Airtel Digital TV showing episodes of Season 1 from 10 May 2019 to 1 November 2019.

Zee TV decided to rerun this series during the first lockdown from 27 April 2020 but it lasted only for 5 days.

Starting 16 August 2021 Shemaroo entertainment re-aired this series on some channels owned by it like Thriller Active, Tata Play Adbhut Kahaniyan and Rahasmay Kahaniyan in subscription basis. It ran successfully till year end.

Reception
In July 1997 a petitioner in Punjab and Haryana high court argued that horror shows promoted superstitions which was affecting the youth. He requested that shows should be aired only after midnight.  Women and children were a significant part of its viewership base so at the urging of Colgate, the show's sponsor, the show's name was changed to Anhonee with the words The Zee Horror Show written below it. Soon the serial name changed to simply "Anhonee" from September 1997.

Ashok Surana was made the co producer of the show along with Ramsay brothers in November 1997. His episodes were directed by Indranil Goswami and would alternate with those made by Ramsay brothers. Some episodes produced by Ashok Surana were Jaal, Aaina and Aakhri Shikar.

See also
 List of Hindi horror shows

References

External links

ZEE Horror Show Streaming on ZEE5

Indian horror fiction television series
Zee TV original programming
1993 Indian television series debuts
1998 Indian television series endings
Indian anthology television series